Larry Poindexter (born December 16, 1959) is an American actor and singer.

Early life
Poindexter was born in Dallas, Texas on December 16, 1959.

Career
He may be best known for his role in 2003's S.W.A.T., in which he played by-the-book LAPD Captain Tom Fuller, who went head to head with Samuel L. Jackson's character "Hondo".

Daytime audiences know him best from ABC soap opera General Hospital as  Asher Thomas. He played Asher from June 3, 2005, until August 8, 2005, when his character was shot and killed by Jason Morgan (Steve Burton) after he murdered A.J. Quartermaine (Billy Warlock) and Rachel Adair (Amy Grabow). His Asher Thomas character was controversial, as his backstory was a retcon of Jason and A.J.'s history.
He was a recurring character on season 3 of JAG, as the doomed lawyer/love interest (Dalton Lowne) of Major Sarah "Mac" MacKenzie (Catherine Bell), who falls prey to another man obsessed with Mac. He appeared in the soap operas Santa Barbara, Days of Our Lives, and was a frequent guest on the MTV show Just Say Julie. He appeared on such primetime shows as Quantum Leap, How I Met Your Mother, and Friends. He appeared in Blade: The Series as FBI agent Ray Collins.

Poindexter was lead singer for the Alt-Country band The High Lonesome in the 1990s. Their album Feel Free To Do So was released in 1995.

Personal life
His father, H. R. Poindexter, is a Tony award-winning light and set designer. His wife is Carol Kritzer, a casting director, whom he married in 2002. The couple has twin sons.

Filmography

External links
 

1959 births
Living people
American male film actors
American male television actors
Male actors from Dallas
20th-century American male actors
21st-century American male actors